Dormers Wells High School is a coeducational secondary school and sixth form in Dormers Wells, in the Ealing area of London, England.

In 2011 the school building and grounds were rebuilt in a £30 million project designed by Nicholas Hare Architects, with Balfour Beatty Construction.

House System
All students and staff at Dormers Wells High School are allocated to one of six Houses.

 Altius
 Citius
 Fortius
 Invictus
 Laurus
 Magnus

Notable former pupils
Trevor Baylis, inventor of wind-up radio
Nathan Caton, comedian

References

External links
 School Website
 School VLE

Secondary schools in the London Borough of Ealing
Academies in the London Borough of Ealing
Southall